Lindores (E&NR) railway station was a temporary terminus that served the village of Lindores, Fife, Scotland in 1847 on the Edinburgh and Northern Railway.

History 
The station opened on 20 September 1847 by the Edinburgh and Northern Railway as a temporary terminus from Ladybank. It was also known as Abdie due to Abdie Church being close by. The station closed when the line was extended to Hilton Junction on 9 December 1847.

References 

Disused railway stations in Fife
Railway stations in Great Britain opened in 1847
Railway stations in Great Britain closed in 1847
1847 establishments in Scotland
1847 disestablishments in Scotland